Verena Hagedorn (born 2 July 1982) is a German former footballer who played as a midfielder. She made 13 appearances for the Germany national team from 2001 to 2003.

References

External links
 

1982 births
Living people
German women's footballers
Women's association football midfielders
Germany women's international footballers
Sportspeople from Bonn